William Anderson Weymouth (Launceston, Tasmania, 24 March 1841 – Hobart, Tasmania, 24 May 1928) was a distinguished amateur botanist. He worked as an insurance assessor with the National Mutual Insurance Company. In 1887 he began collecting mosses and lichens, sending them to several European bryologists including Antonio Jatta in Italy, and Viktor Brotherus in Finland. Jatta named a species of lichen in honour of Weymouth called Ochrolechia weymouthii, and Brotherus named the moss genus Weymouthia. Weymouth published several papers on mosses from Tasmania.

Publications 
He published a number of papers on Tasmanian bryophytes in 1893 and 1894–1895, including: 
 Weymouth, William Anderson (1894) "Some Additions to the Moss Flora of Tasmania", Papers and Proceedings of the Royal Society of Tasmania
 Weymouth, William Anderson and Rodway, Leonard (1921) "Bryophyte notes", Papers and Proceedings of the Royal Society of Tasmania, pp. 173–175

References 

Bryologists
20th-century Australian botanists
1841 births
1928 deaths
People from Launceston, Tasmania
19th-century Australian botanists